Konrad Krzyżanowski (15 February 1872 – 25 May 1922) was a Ukrainian-born Polish illustrator and painter, primarily of portraits, who was considered to be an early exponent of Expressionism.

Biography
He was born in Kremenchuk. He grew up in Kyiv and took his first art lessons at the Kyiv Drawing School with Mykola Murashko. This was followed by studies at the Imperial Academy of Arts in Saint Petersburg. He was not there long, however, when his distaste for the school's teaching methods developed into a conflict with the Rector and he was expelled.

In 1897, Krzyżanowski moved to Munich, where he took private lessons from Simon Hollósy. Three years later, he settled in Warsaw and, together with Kazimierz Stabrowski, established a painting school, which he ran for four years. From 1904 to 1909, he taught at the Academy of Fine Arts, where he often took his students to paint en plein aire in Lithuania and Finland.

In 1906, Krzyżanowski married the artist , a student at the Academy. After her graduation in 1909, he resigned his position there. From 1912 to 1914 the couple lived in London and Paris, where Michalina studied with Maurice Denis at the Académie Ranson.

In 1914, they returned to Warsaw but, following the outbreak of World War I, went to live with Michalina's relatives in Volhynia. From 1917 to 1918, they lived in Kyiv, where Krzyżanowski taught at the "Polish School of Fine Arts".

After the creation of the Polish Second Republic, they returned to Warsaw and Krzyżanowski re-established his private art school. Among his best-known students were Tadeusz Pruszkowski, Ludwik Konarzewski and Krystyna Wróblewska.

Krzyżanowski died in Warsaw on 25 May 1922.

Selected paintings

References

Further reading 
 Lija Skalska-Miecik (ed.), Konrad Krzyżanowski 1872-1922. Wystawa monograficzna, National Museum, Warsaw, 1980

External links 

More works by Krzyżanowski @ Pinakoteka

1872 births
1922 deaths
Expressionist painters
19th-century Polish painters
19th-century Polish male artists
20th-century Polish painters
20th-century Polish male artists
Polish landscape painters
Academic staff of the Academy of Fine Arts in Warsaw
People from Kremenchuk
Polish portrait painters
Polish male painters